BarH-like homeobox 2 is a protein in humans that is encoded by the BARHL2 gene.

References

Further reading

Genes on human chromosome 1